Petrochirus diogenes is a giant marine hermit crab. This species lives in the Caribbean Sea, and often inhabits conch shells. This species of hermit crab is large enough that it can inhabit a fully grown shell of Lobatus gigas. It will attack and eat a conch, thus obtaining a meal and a shell. It was originally described by Carl Linnaeus as Cancer diogenes; the specific epithet honours Diogenes of Sinope.

References

Hermit crabs
Crustaceans of the Atlantic Ocean
Crustaceans described in 1758
Taxa named by Carl Linnaeus
Diogenes